Simon de Rojas may refer to:
Simón de Roxas Clemente y Rubio (1777-1827), Spanish botanist
St. Simón de Rojas (1552-1624), Spanish priest, theologian and a spiritual writer